Gerry Citron (8 April 1935 – 8 July 2005) was an English footballer, who played as a winger in the Football League for Chester.

References

Chester City F.C. players
Corinthian-Casuals F.C. players
Rhyl F.C. players
Association football wingers
English Football League players
1935 births
2005 deaths
Footballers from Manchester
English footballers